Pete Sampras defeated Todd Martin in the final, 7–6(7–4), 6–4, 6–4 to win the men's singles tennis title at the 1994 Australian Open.

Jim Courier was the two-time defending champion, but lost in the semifinals to Sampras.

Seeds
The seeded players are listed below. Pete Sampras is the champion; others show the round in which they were eliminated.

  Pete Sampras (champion)
  Michael Stich (first round)
  Jim Courier (semifinals)
  Stefan Edberg (semifinals)
  Goran Ivanišević (quarterfinals)
  Thomas Muster (quarterfinals)
  Cédric Pioline (first round)
  Petr Korda (first round)
  Todd Martin (finalist)
  Magnus Gustafsson (quarterfinals)
  Marc Rosset (third round)
  Alexander Volkov (fourth round)
  Wayne Ferreira (fourth round)
  Karel Nováček (third round)
  Ivan Lendl (fourth round)
  Arnaud Boetsch (second round)

Qualifying

Draw

Key
 Q = Qualifier
 WC = Wild card
 LL = Lucky loser
 r = Retired

Finals

Section 1

Section 2

Section 3

Section 4

Section 5

Section 6

Section 7

Section 8

External links
 Association of Tennis Professionals (ATP) – 1994 Australian Open Men's Singles draw
 1994 Australian Open – Men's draws and results at the International Tennis Federation

Mens singles
Australian Open (tennis) by year – Men's singles